The Nanjing Olympic Sports Center Gymnasium (Simplified Chinese: 南京奥林匹克体育中心体育馆) is an indoor arena in Nanjing, China. The arena is mainly used for indoor sports such as basketball and figure skating. The facility has a capacity of 13,000 people and was opened in 2005. It is located near Nanjing Olympic Sports Center Stadium.

Notable events 
 17 & 18 January 2009: Super Show Tour – Super Junior, sold-out on both dates, added up to 20,000 people.
 12 December 2009: 2nd Asia Tour – Super Show 2 – Super Junior 
 18 & 20 January: 2009 World Women's Handball Championship, final round with semifinals and finals
 13 November 2010: 3rd Asia Tour – Super Show 3 – Super Junior
 20 August 2011: 1st Asia Tour – SHINee WORLD – Shinee
 29 March 2015: Super Show 6 World Tour – Super Junior return with their World Tour to Nanjing after 5 years and performed to a sold-out crowd of 13,983 people.
 9 August 2015: Made World Tour 2015 – Big Bang

See also
 Nanjing Olympic Sports Center

References

External links 
 

Indoor arenas in China
Sports venues in Nanjing
Sports venues completed in 2005
Handball venues in China